is a railway station located in Adachi, Tokyo, Japan. The station opened on 30 March 2008. The park is named for the adjacent Toneri Park.

Lines 
The station is served by the Nippori-Toneri Line operated by Tokyo Metropolitan Bureau of Transportation (Toei).

Platforms 
This elevated station consists of two island platforms serving three tracks. The center track leads to a yard north of the station.

History 
The station opened on 30 March 2008, when the Nippori-Toneri Liner began operation.

Station numbering was introduced in November 2017 with the station receiving station number NT11.

References

External links
 Toei Toneri Station 

Railway stations in Tokyo
Railway stations in Japan opened in 2008
Nippori-Toneri Liner